Keystone National High School is a private correspondence and online distance high school based in Pennsylvania, United States. Students can earn their high school diploma at Keystone or take courses to supplement another high school or homeschool program. The school's first courses were introduced in 1974 as part of the Learning and Evaluation Center. Keystone took its current name and became a major part of the homeschool market in 1994. Over 200,000 have enrolled in Keystone's educational programs. The current enrollment is 10,000+ students. 

K12 Inc. (now named Stride) acquired Keystone in 2010.

Mascot and colors
The mascot of Keystone National High School is the coyote, as was announced in the school newsletter, KeyNews, after a student-wide vote. The school colors are burgundy and silver.

Notable alumni
Michaela DePrince, ballerina for the Dutch National Ballet
 Takanyi Garanganga, tennis player
 Maria Sharapova, Russian tennis player

References

External links 
 
 

Private high schools in Pennsylvania
1974 establishments in Pennsylvania
Educational institutions established in 1974